A four-year, high school located in Kennett Square, Pennsylvania, Unionville High School enrolls approximately 1,300 students. Accredited by the Middle Atlantic States Association of Secondary Schools, and the Commonwealth of Pennsylvania, Unionville High School has received state recognition for excellence and high achievement in the preparation of students for higher education. Each year, more than 95% of the Unionville High School graduating class takes the SAT examinations. Over 95% of all graduating seniors pursue some form of higher education; 89% go to 4-year colleges, while 7% go to 2-year colleges.

Academics

Curriculum 

Unionville has a 1:12 teacher-to-student ratio, allowing it to offer a wide range of both core and elective classes for its students. Its core departments- English, Social Studies, Math, and Science- are based on a four-tier system in order to allow for the variety of student capabilities, from First Level and Academic classes to Honors and Advanced Placement ; in an attempt to broaden its curriculum, the school recently began to offer differentiated classes within those tiers, such as a choice between an American Literature Survey and Contemporary Young Adult Fiction for 11th grade Academic English students. Every graduating student must take four years each of English and Social Studies and three years each of Math and Science, among other requirements.

Achievement 

Unionville High School has received state recognition for excellence and high achievement in preparing students for higher education; it consistently ranks as one of the top public high schools in the state of Pennsylvania, according to Pennsylvania's high school's standardized tests, the PSSAs, and in 2008 the Unionville-Chadds Ford School District had the highest PSSA scores in the State of Pennsylvania.

College readiness 

Unionville employs a 6-member full-time counseling staff, much of whose time is spent on the college application process, including meeting with every junior and senior at least once per year to determine their post-secondary educational needs and how the office can best facilitate them; 94% of graduating seniors in 2008 are currently attending college, 96% of which are four-year institutions. Additionally, Unionville's SAT results are significantly higher than the national average, with a combined average of 1716 on the 2400 scale in 2008; there were 4 National Merit Semifinalists in 2010.

Activities and awards 

Unionville High School has a total of 72 registered clubs (about one club for every 20 students), including five intra-school academic competition teams (such as Debate Team and Future Business Leaders of America), four honor societies, and several national and international organizations (such as Amnesty International and Habitat for Humanity), in addition to quirks such as the Bocce Club and the Unionville Signers (promoting the education of sign language).

The Unionville Players received many Cappies nominations and won 2 for the Fall play, Hamlet.

UHS Speech and Debate team is ranked in the top 3% (top 20) of roughly 3,600 high schools; #1 for the Philadelphia / Valley Forge area; #3 in the State of Pennsylvania, District 15 Champion for 2017–2018. State Champions in 2 of 8 categories and runners up in another 2 with one 3rd-place finish and 5 semifinalists.

Demographics

Race
As of 2015-2016:

Gender
Male: 52%
Female: 48%

In popular culture
Unionville High School was given as the alma mater of "John David Stutts", the man who (fictionally) killed "Buckwheat" (both characters played by Eddie Murphy) on a 1983 episode of Saturday Night Live. The skit says Stutts actually grew up in Lima, Ohio, but the Pennsylvania-based Unionville High got the credit after the UHS drama club put on a production of "Who Shot Buckwheat?". (SNL also showed the school's real exterior on-air.)

Notable alumni
Kate Barber, captain of the US Women's Field Hockey Team in the 2008 Summer Olympics
Amanda McGrory, paralympic gold medalist
Zeeko Zaki, actor
Justin Best

References

Educational institutions established in 1985
Public high schools in Pennsylvania
Schools in Chester County, Pennsylvania
1985 establishments in Pennsylvania
Kennett Square, Pennsylvania